Mary Frances Davidson (1902 – 29 May 1986) was an Irish Labour Party politician. She was elected to Seanad Éireann on the Industrial and Commercial Panel at a by-election on 16 June 1950. She lost her seat at the 1951 Seanad election but was re-elected at the 1954 Seanad election and was re-elected at each subsequent election until she retired at the 1969 Seanad election. She was formally appointed Labour Party General Secretary on the 28 June 1962. She was the first female General Secretary of any Irish political party.

References

1902 births
1986 deaths
Labour Party (Ireland) senators
Members of the 6th Seanad
Members of the 8th Seanad
Members of the 9th Seanad
Members of the 10th Seanad
Members of the 11th Seanad
20th-century women members of Seanad Éireann
Politicians from County Dublin